Richland Township is one of twelve townships in Chickasaw County, Iowa, USA.  As of the 2000 census, its population was 369.

History
Richland Township was organized in 1856.

Geography
According to the USGS, it contains one cemetery, Richland Township.

The streams of Etter Creek and Little Wapsipinicon River run through this township.

Notes

References
 USGS Geographic Names Information System (GNIS)

External links
 US-Counties.com
 City-Data.com

Townships in Chickasaw County, Iowa
Townships in Iowa